Fly Lappeenranta Limited (Fly Lappeenranta Oy) was a regional airline with its head office on the grounds of Lappeenranta Airport in Lappeenranta, Finland. It offered daily flights between Lappeenranta and Helsinki using a fleet of 2 Saab 340 2008 and Jetstream 31 2009 aircraft, which were operated first by Central Connect Airlines and then by Highland Airways.

Founded in 2008, the activities of Fly Lappeenranta were stopped in 2010.

References

External links

2008 establishments in Finland
2010 disestablishments in Finland
Airlines established in 2008
Airlines disestablished in 2010
Defunct airlines of Finland
Finnish companies established in 2008